Robidoux Hill Historic District is a national historic district located at St. Joseph, Missouri. The district encompasses 61 contributing buildings in a predominantly residential section of St. Joseph. It developed between about 1865 and 1909, and includes representative examples of Italianate, Second Empire, and Queen Anne style architecture. Located in the district is the separately listed Edmond Jacques Eckel House designed by architect Edmond Jacques Eckel (1845–1934).  Other notable buildings include the Lemon House (1871), Donovan House (c. 1865, 1895), McKinney House (1887), Inslee House (c. 1867), Jonathan M. Bassett (c. 1860, 1880s), and U.S. Weather Bureau Building (1909).

It was listed on the National Register of Historic Places in 1989.

References

Historic districts on the National Register of Historic Places in Missouri
Italianate architecture in Missouri
Second Empire architecture in Missouri
Queen Anne architecture in Missouri
Historic districts in St. Joseph, Missouri
National Register of Historic Places in Buchanan County, Missouri